The following list of mathematical symbols by subject features a selection of the most common symbols used in modern mathematical notation within formulas, grouped by mathematical topic. As it is impossible to know if a complete list existing today of all symbols used in history is a representation of all ever used in history, as this would necessitate knowing if extant records are of all usages, only those symbols which occur often in mathematics or mathematics education are included. Many of the characters are standardized, for example in DIN 1302 General mathematical symbols or DIN EN ISO 80000-2 Quantities and units – Part 2: Mathematical signs for science and technology.

The following list is largely limited to non-alphanumeric characters. It is divided by areas of mathematics and grouped within sub-regions. Some symbols have a different meaning depending on the context and appear accordingly several times in the list. Further information on the symbols and their meaning can also be found in the respective linked articles.

Guide

The following information is provided for each mathematical symbol:

Symbol The symbol as it is represented by LaTeX. If there are several typographic variants, only one of the variants is shown.
Usage An exemplary use of the symbol in a formula. Letters here stand as a placeholder for numbers, variables or complex expressions. Different possible applications are listed separately.
Articles with usage Examples of Wikipedia articles in which the symbol is used.
LaTeX The LaTeX command that creates the icon. Characters from the ASCII character set can be used directly, with a few exceptions (e.g., pound sign #, backslash \, braces {}, and percent sign %). High-and low-position is indicated via the ^ and _ characters, and is not explicitly specified.
HTML The icon in HTML, if it is defined as a named mark. Non-named characters can be indicated in the form &#xnnnn by specifying the Unicode code point of the next column. High-and low-position can be indicated via <sup></sup> and <sub></sub>. The character × whose HTML code is times can be displayed by typing &times;.
Unicode The code point of the corresponding Unicode character. Some characters are combining and require the entry of additional characters. For brackets, the code points of opening and closing forms are specified. The Unicode character ⨯ whose hexadecimal value is U+2A2F can be displayed by typing &#x2A2F; where #x indicates that the value in hexadecimal.

Numbers

Number sets

Intervals

Mathematical constants

Complex numbers

Elementary arithmetic operations

Elementary functions

Note: the power function is not represented by its own icon, but by the positioning of the exponent as a superscript.

Trigonometric functions

Arithmetic comparison

See also: Order relations, Set relations

Number theory

Divisibility and modulo

Combinatorics

Stochastics

Probability theory

Remark: for operators there are several notational variants; instead of round brackets also square brackets are used

Statistics

Calculus

Sequences and series

Limits

Differential calculus

Integral calculus

Vector calculus

Asymptotic behaviour

Linear algebra

Vectors and matrices

Vector operations

Matrix operations

Vector spaces

Functional analysis

Logic

The current Wikipedia guidelines advise against unnecessary use of ∀, ∃, and ⇔ and instead recommend writing out "for all", "there exists", and "if and only if." The same is true of abbreviations such as "iff", "s.t.", and "WLOG".

Equality signs

Logical operators

Quantifiers

Deduction symbols

End of proof symbols

Formal language and strings

Functions and category theory

Functions

Morphisms

Constructions

Set theory

Definition symbols

Set construction

Separator symbols

To scale a set's braces \{ \} to the size of the set's content, use \left\{  \right\}. 
Wikipedia does not support \middle as that requires e-TeX, although \big|, \Big|, \bigg|, or \Bigg| can be used in place of \middle|. However, unlike with \mid, whitespace \; around the bar | must be inserted manually; for example: \;\big|\; or \mathrel{}\big|\mathrel{}.

Set operations

Set relations

Cardinality

Equivalence classes/relations

Order theory

Comparions

See also: Arithmetic comparison, Set relations

Binary relations

Algebra

Group theory

Field theory

Ring theory

Geometry

Euclidean geometry

Differential geometry

Topology

Alphanumeric Symbols

Digits

Alphabets

Greek Letters

See also

Unicode and LaTeX

 List of mathematical symbols
 List of logic symbols
 Blackboard bold#Usage
 Help:Displaying a formula

LaTeX

 Help:Displaying a formula#Formatting using TeX - An extensive list of LaTeX examples.
 Wikipedia:LaTeX symbols

Unicode

 Lists of Mathematical operators and symbols in Unicode
 Mathematical Operators and Supplemental Mathematical Operators
 List of mathematical symbols
 Miscellaneous Math Symbols: A, B, Technical
 Arrow (symbol) and Miscellaneous Symbols and Arrows and arrow symbols
 ISO 31-11 (Mathematical signs and symbols for use in physical sciences and technology)
 Number Forms
 Geometric Shapes
 Wikipedia:Mathematical symbols
 Mathematical Alphanumeric Symbols (Unicode block)
 Mathematical constants and functions
 Table of mathematical symbols by introduction date
 List of Unicode characters
 Letterlike Symbols
 Unicode block

Conventions and guidelines

 Typographical conventions and common meanings of symbols:
 APL syntax and symbols
 Greek letters used in mathematics, science, and engineering
 Latin letters used in mathematics
 List of common physics notations
 List of letters used in mathematics and science
 List of mathematical abbreviations
 Mathematical notation
 Notation in probability and statistics
 Physical constants
 Wikipedia notation and formula guidelines:
 Wikipedia:Manual of Style/Mathematics#Mathematical conventions
 Wikipedia:WikiProject Logic/Standards for notation
 Help:Special characters

Other

 Diacritic
 Language of mathematics

Bibliography

 
 
 Deutsches Institut für Normung: DIN 1302: Allgemeine mathematische Zeichen und Begriffe, Beuth-Verlag, 1999.
 Deutsches Institut für Normung: DIN 1303: Vektoren, Matrizen, Tensoren; Zeichen und Begriffe, Beuth-Verlag, 1987.
 International Standards Organisation: DIN EN ISO 80000-2: Größen und Einheiten – Teil 2: Mathematische Zeichen für Naturwissenschaft und Technik, 2013.

Note: This article is a translation of the German Wikipedia article :de:Liste mathematischer Symbole.

External links

LaTeX and Unicode

 Symbols defined by unicode-math - Lists LaTeX and corresponding Unicode symbols
 Unicode characters and corresponding LaTeX math mode command

LaTeX

 
 Detexify − Online tool: Find LaTeX code for a symbol by drawing it.

Unicode

 Symbols defined by unicode-math
  "Mathematical Operators – Unicode" (PDF). Retrieved 2013-07-20.
 Lists Unicode Block "Mathematical Operators"
 Lists Unicode Block "Supplemental Mathematical Operators"
 Lists Unicode Block "Miscellaneous Mathematical Symbols-A"
 Lists Unicode Block "Miscellaneous Mathematical Symbols-B"
 Lists Unicode Block "Mathematical Alphanumeric Symbols
 Shapecatcher − Online tool: Find Unicode and HTML codes for a symbol by drawing it.

 
Mathematics
Symbols

Symbols
Symbols